Blato is a small settlement north of Trebnje in eastern Slovenia. The area is part of the historical Lower Carniola region. The Municipality of Trebnje is now included in the Southeast Slovenia Statistical Region.

Name
Blato was attested in written sources as Mos in 1342 and Moss in 1436.

References

External links
 Blato at Geopedia

Populated places in the Municipality of Trebnje